The Curious City is Modey Lemon's third album and was the first to be recorded with the current line-up. The cover art was painted by Erick Jackson.

Track listing
"Bucket Of Butterflies" - 3:37
"Sleep Walkers" - 3:55
"In Another Land" - 5:15
"Mr. Mercedes" - 3:15
"Fingers, Drains" - 5:17
"Red Lights" - 5:22
"In The Cemetery" - 4:17
"Mountain Mist" - 2:51
"Countries" - 4:16
"Trapped Rabbits" - 16:19

Personnel
Paul Quattrone - drums
Phil Boyd - vocals, guitar and synthesizers
Jason Kirker - bass guitar and keyboards

2005 albums
Modey Lemon albums
Birdman Records albums